Josie Carroll (born December 8, 1957) is a Canadian Thoroughbred horse trainer, who in 2006 became the first woman trainer to win the Queen's Plate, the oldest thoroughbred horse race in Canada and Canada's most prestigious race. She also won the Queen's Plate in 2011 and 2020, the Prince of Wales Stakes in 2016 and 2020, and the Breeder's Stakes in 2014

Born in Scarborough, Ontario, Carroll undertook an equine studies course at Humber College before embarking on a racing career in 1975 in the employ of Canadian Horse Racing Hall of Fame trainer Mac Benson at Windfields Farm. She worked as an assistant trainer until 1994. She had early success with Tethra, owned by members of the prominent Eaton family.

In recent years she has been one of the leading trainers at Woodbine Racetrack in Toronto and has won a number of graded stakes races both in Canada and in the United States.

Prior to the 2006 winning run, she had had one horse compete in the Queen's Plate. Her 2006 entry, Edenwold, earned the Sovereign Award as Canada's top two-year-old in 2005, but observers of the sport believed the colt could not sustain the Queen's Plate distance of a mile and a quarter. Ridden by jockey Emile Ramsammy, her winning horse was considered a long shot, going off at 16-1 odds in the $1 million Grade I Queen's Plate.

Carroll's first Grade I win came in 2009 with Careless Jewel, who won the Alabama Stakes.

Carroll is the second female trainer to take Canada's most prestigious race for three-year-old fillies, the Woodbine Oaks with Inglorious in 2011 – who went on to win the Plate for Carroll that same year. In 2019, she was inducted into the Canadian Horse Racing Hall of Fame.

Canadian Triple Crown

Prior to the 2006 winning run, she had had one horse compete in the Queen's Plate. Her 2006 entry, Edenwold, earned the Sovereign Award as Canada's top two-year-old in 2005, but observers of the sport believed the colt could not sustain the Queen's Plate distance of a mile and a quarter. Ridden by jockey Emile Ramsammy, her winning horse was considered a long shot, going off at 16-1 odds in the $1 million Grade I Queen's Plate.

In 2020, Josie Carroll won all three of the Canadian Triple Crown series. She won the first two with Mighty Heart and the third with stablemate Belichick.

References

External links
 Josie Carroll's biography at Woodbine Entertainment

1957 births
Living people
Animal sportspeople from Ontario
Canadian horse trainers
Canadian sportswomen
Sportspeople from Scarborough, Toronto
Canadian Horse Racing Hall of Fame inductees